This is a list of singles which have reached number one on the Irish Singles Chart in 1981.

 24 Number Ones
 Most weeks at No.1 (song): "You Drive Me Crazy" - Shakin' Stevens (6)
 Most weeks at Number One (artist): Shakin' Stevens (13)
 Most No.1s: John Lennon, Shakin' Stevens (3)

See also 
 1981 in music
 Irish Singles Chart
 List of artists who reached number one in Ireland

1981 in Irish music
1981 record charts
1981